Katie-Jemima Yeats-Brown (born 5 July 1995) is a British judoka who trains full-time at the British Judo Centre of Excellence in Walsall.

Judo career
Yeats-Brown competed for England in the  event at the 2014 Commonwealth Games where she won a bronze medal.

She is a three times champion of Great Britain, winning the middleweight division at the British Judo Championships in 2016 and 2017 and the half-heavyweight title in 2018. In 2018, she finished fifth in the 2018 World Judo Championships in Baku, when ranked world 32 on IJF ranking list. Compeign in the women's 78 kg category she lost to Guusje Steenhuis in the quarter finals.

in 2022, she went to her second Commonwealth Games, competing in the women's 70 kg category she won a bronze medal.

References

External links
 
 

1995 births
Living people
English female judoka
Commonwealth Games bronze medallists for England
Judoka at the 2014 Commonwealth Games
Judoka at the 2022 Commonwealth Games
Commonwealth Games medallists in judo
European Games competitors for Great Britain
Judoka at the 2019 European Games
People from Pembury
Medallists at the 2022 Commonwealth Games